Elise Dalby Grønnesby (born 17 December 1995 in Hamar, Norway) is a Norwegian model and beauty pageant titleholder who was crowned Miss Norway 2014 and represented her country at the Miss Universe 2014 pageant.

Early life
Dalby is a model from Hamar, Norway. She has the longest hair in Miss Norway history. Her older brother (Andreas Dalby Grønnesby; born 16 July 1994 and died 22 July 2011) was one of the victims in the 2011 Norway attacks.

Pageantry

Miss Norway 2014
Dalby represented Hamar and was crowned Miss Norway 2014 on 28 June 2014. She received the crown from the previous winner, Mari Chauhan, who also came from Hamar.

Miss Universe 2014
Dalby competed at the Miss Universe 2014 pageant but was unplaced.

References

External links
Official Miss Universe Norway website

Living people
People from Hamar
Norwegian female models
1995 births
Miss Universe 2014 contestants